A cinnamon roll (also known as cinnamon bun, cinnamon swirl, cinnamon Danish and cinnamon snail) is a sweet roll commonly served in Northern Europe (mainly in Nordic countries, but also in Austria and Germany) and North America.  In Sweden it is called kanelbulle, in Denmark it is known as kanelsnegl, in Norway it is known as kanelbolle, skillingsbolle or kanelsnurr, in Finland it is known as korvapuusti, in Iceland it is known as kanilsnúður, and in Estonia it is known as kaneelirull.  In Austria and Germany it is called Zimtschnecke.

Pastry
A cinnamon roll consists of a rolled sheet of yeast-leavened dough onto which a cinnamon and sugar mixture (and raisins or other ingredients in some cases) is sprinkled over a thin coat of butter. The dough is then rolled, cut into individual portions and baked. The deep fried version is cinnamon roll or cinnamon bun doughnut. Its main ingredients are flour, cinnamon, sugar, and butter, which provide a robust and sweet flavor.

Origins
Roman spice traders introduced the Sri Lankan cinnamon spice to Europe.

Much later, Sweden began using it in its pastries, developing the kanelbulle. Since 1999, October 4 has been promoted as  Cinnamon Roll Day  (Kanelbullens dag). Swedish kanelbulle dough typically also contains cardamom (powder or buds), giving it a distinctive flavour.

Haga, a district in Gothenburg, Sweden, is well known for its very large cinnamon rolls. These cinnamon rolls are called hagabullar or 'Queen of the kitchen'. Hagabullar are usually  or more in diameter and are, despite their size, not considered a communal roll. Each person usually orders one each.

National variations
The Swedish Butterkaka and Finnish bostonkakku ("Boston cake") is a cake made by baking cinnamon rolls in a round cake pan instead of baking them separately, so that they stick together to form a large, round cake.

A German variety, which closely follows the form of the Scandinavian pastry, originating in Hamburg and its surroundings is the Franzbrötchen, a cinnamon pastry inspired by the non-cinnamon French croissant.

The British version is called Chelsea bun, which they invented in the 18th century. It is now available in cafes, supermarkets, and bakeries across the UK.

American cinnamon rolls are frequently topped with icing (usually confectioners' sugar-based) and are sometimes fried, finished with glaze, and served as a variation of a raised donut. There are also regional combinations: in the American Midwest, especially Nebraska and Kansas, cinnamon rolls are commonly eaten with chili.

In Canada, they are known as cinnamon buns. They are usually self-glazed and not iced, nor do they usually have raisins. They can have so much cinnamon that they are spicy and hot to the taste.

In Austria and Germany they are widely available at supermarkets and bakeries. Along with Topfengolatsche, Buttercroissant and Faschingskrapfen they are a typical pastry to have with afternoon coffee.

Cinnamon roll traditions
In Sweden and Finland, cinnamon rolls are traditionally enjoyed during a coffee break, or fika, which is a get-together with friends. National Cinnamon Bun Day (Kanelbullens dag) is observed on October 4 in Sweden and Finland.

In North America, it is commonly eaten for breakfast or dessert. When eaten for a breakfast in the U.S., it may be served with cream cheese frosting.

Gallery

See also

 List of buns

References

Sweet breads
Swedish pastries
Danish pastries
Norwegian desserts
Finnish pastries
Icelandic cuisine
Estonian desserts
German pastries
Austrian pastries
Buns
Cinnamon
American desserts
Canadian desserts